Paris s'eveille - suivi d'autres compositions is a soundtrack album by Welsh multi-instrumentalist and composer John Cale. It was released in 1991 on Belgian independent label Les Disques du Crépuscule. Primarily the album represents the soundtrack from Olivier Assayas' film Paris s'eveille, featuring the Soldier String Quartet). Cale wrote "Sanctus" for the Randy Warshaw Dance Company in 1987, "Animals at Night" for the Ralph Lemon Dance Company in the same year, and "Primary Motive" for Daniel Adams' film Primary Motive. "Booker T." was recorded live by The Velvet Underground at the Gymnasium club in New York in April 1967. The final song is a newly recorded version of "Antarctica Starts Here" from Cale's 1973 album Paris 1919.

Track listing 
All tracks composed by John Cale, except "Booker T." by Cale, Sterling Morrison, Lou Reed and Maureen Tucker. String arrangements and orchestra conducted by Dave Soldier.
"Paris s'eveille" − 17:07
"Sanctus (Four Etudes for Electronic Orchestra)" − 18:49
"First Etude"
"Second Etude"
"Third Etude"
"Fourth Etude"
"Animals at Night" − 4:46
"The Cowboy Laughs at the Round-up" − 5:04
"Primary Motive" − 7:20
"Factory Speech"
"Strategy Session"
"Closing Titles"
"Booker T." − 3:07
"Antarctica Starts Here" − 3:20

References

External links
 Paris s'eveille - suivi d'autres compositions at Allmusic
 Paris s'eveille - suivi d'autres compositions at Discogs

John Cale soundtracks
1991 soundtrack albums
Albums produced by John Cale